Nikolai Konstantinovich Baibakov (6 March 1911 – 31 March 2008) was a Soviet statesman and economist who served as Minister of Oil Industry from 1944 to 1946 and 1948 to 1955 and Chairman of the State Planning Committee from 1955 to 1957 and 1965 to 1985. He was awarded a Hero of Socialist Labour in 1981.

Biography 
Born in Sabunchu, near Baku, Russian Empire, Baibakov finished secondary school in 1928 and entered the Azerbaijan Oil and Chemistry Institute, from which he graduated in 1931 as a mining engineer. In 1935, he was drafted into the armed forces. After completing his military service, he was appointed chief of the oilfield production department in an industrial complex in the USSR. Later he was promoted to chief engineer, then general director. He was responsible for evacuating oil industry facilities to the eastern regions during the Nazi invasion.

Baibakov was appointed to the Narkomat as Minister of Oil Industry in 1944, serving until 1946. Because of his success in the planning of the oil industry sector and experience in economics, he was appointed as Chairman of the State Planning Committee, commonly known as Gosplan, in 1955. He left the post in 1957 but returned to it in 1965. After stepping down in 1985, he continued to work as a state councillor in the Presidium of the Council of Ministers until 1988. Then he was appointed head of the oil and gas section of the Academic Board of the Oil and Gas Institute with the Russian Academy of Sciences. He died in 2008 in Moscow.

Honours and awards
 Hero of Socialist Labour (1981)
 Order "For Merit to the Fatherland", 2nd class (March 7, 2006) - for outstanding services to the state
 Six Orders of Lenin
 Order of the October Revolution
 Order of the Red Banner of Labour, twice
 Lenin Prize (1963) - for the discovery and development of gas-condensate fields
 Honorary Member of the Russian Academy of Natural Sciences (RANS, established in 1996 was awarded the Medal of the Academy)
 Academician of the Academy of Cosmonautics
 Laureate of the "Russian National Olympus"
 Honorary Citizen of Ishimbai (Bashkortostan) - as an active participant in the development of Bashkir oil industry (made with such an initiative in 1940)
 Istiglal Order (Azerbaijan)

References

External links
Inside Gosplan
Baibakov's removal from office

1911 births
2008 deaths
20th-century Russian engineers
Engineers from Baku
People from Baku Governorate
Honorary Members of the Russian Academy of Natural Sciences
Heroes of Socialist Labour
Lenin Prize winners
Recipients of the Istiglal Order
Recipients of the Order "For Merit to the Fatherland", 2nd class
Recipients of the Order of Lenin
Recipients of the Order of the Red Banner of Labour
Azerbaijani people of Russian descent
Soviet economists
Marxian economists
Soviet engineers
Burials at Novodevichy Cemetery